All of the 5 Kansas incumbents were re-elected.

See also 
 List of United States representatives from Kansas
 United States House of Representatives elections, 1972

1972
Kansas
United States House of Representatives